Hydrodessus is a genus of beetles in the family Dytiscidae, containing the following species:

 Hydrodessus amazonensis Spangler, 1966
 Hydrodessus angularis Young, 1970
 Hydrodessus biguttatus (Guignot, 1957)
 Hydrodessus brasiliensis (Guignot, 1957)
 Hydrodessus fragrans Spangler, 1985
 Hydrodessus jethoeae Makhan, 1994
 Hydrodessus nanayensis Spangler, 1966
 Hydrodessus octospilus (Guignot, 1957)
 Hydrodessus peloteretes Spangler, 1985
 Hydrodessus pereirai (Guignot, 1957)
 Hydrodessus phyllisae Spangler, 1985
 Hydrodessus rattanae Makhan, 1994
 Hydrodessus robinae Spangler, 1985
 Hydrodessus siolii J.Balfour-Browne, 1953
 Hydrodessus soekhnandanae Makhan, 1994
 Hydrodessus spanus Spangler, 1985
 Hydrodessus surinamensis Young, 1970

References

Dytiscidae